William Sawyer (1803 – 1877) was a two-term member of the United States House of Representatives from Ohio from 1845 to 1849.

Biography 
Sawyer was born in Montgomery County, Ohio.  In 1818 he began to learn the trade of blacksmithing.  He worked at this occupation in both Dayton, Ohio, and Grand Rapids, Michigan.  In 1829 he settled in Miamisburg, Ohio.  From 1832-1835 Sawyer served in the Ohio House of Representatives, filling the position of speaker in 1835.  In 1838 and 1840 he ran unsuccessfully for congress.

In 1843 Sawyer moved to St. Marys, Ohio.  He was elected to United States Congress as a Democrat in 1844.  He was reelected in 1846 but did not run for re-election in 1848.

Sawyer 'liked to stand by the Speaker's chair during debates noisily munching sausages and cornbread and using his pants for a napkin and his jack-knife for a toothpick'.

In 1850-1851 Sawyer served as a member of the Ohio State Constitutional Convention.  He served another term in the State House in 1856.  He also served as mayor of St. Marys and a Federal land agent in Minnesota.

Sources
Congressional biography

References

Ohio State University trustees
1803 births
1877 deaths
People from Montgomery County, Ohio
People from St. Mary's, Ohio
Ohio lawyers
Speakers of the Ohio House of Representatives
Mayors of places in Ohio
Ohio Constitutional Convention (1850)
19th-century American politicians
Democratic Party members of the Ohio House of Representatives
19th-century American lawyers
Democratic Party members of the United States House of Representatives from Ohio